Carlos Salvadores (born 27 December 1960) is a Spanish former alpine skier who competed in the 1984 Winter Olympics.

References

1960 births
Living people
Spanish male alpine skiers
Olympic alpine skiers of Spain
Alpine skiers at the 1984 Winter Olympics
Universiade medalists in alpine skiing
Place of birth missing (living people)
Universiade gold medalists for Spain
Universiade bronze medalists for Spain
Competitors at the 1983 Winter Universiade
Competitors at the 1985 Winter Universiade
20th-century Spanish people